Nelly Littlehale Umbstaetter Murphy (1867-1941) was an American artist.  She was born in Stockton, California, and moved to Boston when she married her first husband, H. D. Umbstaetter.  She drew many of the covers for The Black Cat, the magazine her husband edited from 1895 to 1912, and a collection of the covers was advertised as a free gift with subscriptions to the magazine in 1905.  She studied with Joseph De Camp and Charles Howard Walker.  Her first husband died in 1913, and she married Hermann Dudley Murphy in 1916.

List of exhibitions 
Her exhibitions included the following:

 Boston City Club: 1916
 Guild of Boston Artists: 1926 (solo) and 1937
 Macbeth Gallery, New York: 1929 (solo)
 Boston Art Club: 1929

References

Sources 

 
 

American women artists
People from Stockton, California
1867 births
1941 deaths